Oseledets or chub is a traditional Ukrainian style of haircut that features a long lock of hair left on the otherwise completely shaved head, commonly sprouting from the top or the front of an otherwise closely shaven head. Most commonly it is associated with the Ukrainian cossacks, although first mentions of the haircut go back to Sviatoslav I. Nowadays it's a common surname also.

A Russian name for oseledets, khokhol, is commonly used as an ethnic slur for Ukrainians.

History

Halfshaven haircuts have been worn by the inhabitants of Ukraine since the early Middle Ages. The Viking rulers of Kyivan Rus imitated the traditional costume and hairstyles of their Slavic subjects. Many of these Vikings joined the Varangian guard of the Roman Empire in Constantinople, and introduced the haircut to their comrades from Denmark. Subsequent generations of Viking colonists spread it to Anglo-Saxon England, and to France. William the Bastard of Normandy is depicted in the Bayeux Tapestry with a halfshaven haircut.

A closely related haircut was worn by the Wends of early medieval Poland, and later by the Polish nobility from the 12th until the 18th century.

During the 16th and 17th century, the Cossacks of Ukraine would shave their heads, leaving a long central strip which was often braided or tied in a topknot.

The oseledets underwent a revival among romantics and nationalists during the early 20th century. After the Bolshevik revolution and Russian Civil War however, Ukrainian culture was suppressed as part of Stalin's de-Cossackization because many Cossacks from Ukraine had fought in the Tsarist White Army.

After independence, the oseledets made a comeback among modern Ukrainians. It was seen during the Euromaidan protests of 2014, and during the Russian invasion of Ukraine in 2022.

Ukrainian culture
The Ukrainian name for this type of haircut is oseledets (literally "herring") or chub (meaning "crest"). There are several Ukrainian surnames derived from this word. In the Cossacks times, the haircut carried an honorary meaning, identifying one as being a true Cossack. That tradition is depicted in various motion pictures such as Propala Hramota that is based on works of Nikolai Gogol. 
Historically, Ukrainians used the term khokhol amongst themselves as a form of ethnic self-identification, in order to visibly separate themselves from Russians.

The oseledets/khokhol is a standard feature in the stereotypical image of a Ukrainian Cossack.

Ethnic slur
Russians commonly use the word khokhol (plural ) as an ethnic slur for Ukrainians, as it was a common haircut of Ukrainian Cossacks. The term is usually derogatory or condescending. The word comes from Proto-Slavic xoxolъ < *koxolъ, “crest, tuft.”

In addition to calling Ukrainians khokhols, Russians also refer to Ukraine as Khokhliandiia and Khokhlostan.

In popular culture 

 Uhtred of Bebbanburg in the TV adaptation of Bernard Cornwell's The Last Kingdom.

See also
 List of hairstyles

Bibliography 

 Хохол // Словник української мови : в 11 т. — К. : Наукова думка, 1970–1980.
 ↑ (рос.)Андрей Моченов, Сергей Никулин. «Хохлы», «пиндосы», «чухонцы» и прочие «бусурмане» в Рунете и российской прессе. 28 июня 2006. MCK
 ↑ (рос.)Заява національно-культурної автономії українців Новосибірську
 ↑ Хахол // Украдене ім'я: Чому русини стали українцями / Є. П. Наконечний; Передмова Я. Дашкевича. — 3-є, доп. і випр. вид. — Львів, 2001. — 400 с. — ISBN 966-02-1895-8.
 ↑ (рос.)Етимологічний словник Фасмера стор.796
 ↑ Ставицька Леся. Українська лексика в російському та польському жаргонно-сленговому вокабулярі / Александр Бирих (нім. Alexander Bierich) // Субстандартные варианты славянских языков. — Київ : Peter Lang. Internationaler Verlag der Wissenschaften, 2008. — № 17 (Серпень). — С. 198. — ISSN 0930-7281. — ISBN 978-3-631-57010-4.
 ↑ Хохо́л // Етимологічний словник української мови : у 7 т. : т. 6 / редкол.: О. С. Мельничук (гол. ред.) та ін. — К. : Наукова думка, 2012. — Т. 6 : У — Я. — С. 205–206. — ISBN 978-966-00-0197-8.
 Хохол // Українська мала енциклопедія : 16 кн. : у 8 т. / проф. Є. Онацький. — Накладом Адміністратури УАПЦ в Аргентині. — Буенос-Айрес, 1967. — Т. 8, кн. XVI : Літери Уш — Я. — С. 2017. — 1000 екз.
 Б. Н. Флоря. О значении термина «Хохол» и производных от него в русских источниках первой половины XVII в. (эпизод из истории русско-польско-украинских контактов) // STUDIA POLONICA. К 60-летию Виктора Александровича Хорева. М.: Институт славяноведения и балканистики РАН, 1992.(рос.)

References

See also
 Anti-Ukrainian sentiment
 Chupryna
 Moskal
 Sikha
 Ukrop
 Vatnik (slang)

Anti-Ukrainian sentiment
Cossack culture
Pejorative terms for European people
Hairstyles
Russian language
Shaving